Joseph Driscoll may refer to:
Joseph R. Driscoll (born 1970), American politician, member of the Massachusetts House of Representatives
Joseph Driscoll (Canadian politician) (1876–1942), Canadian politician, municipal councillor in Edmonton
Joe Driscoll (rapper) (born 1979), musician from New York